, son of Nijō Harutaka, was a Japanese kugyō (court noble) of the Edo period (1603–1868). He married a Tokugawa Juko (1796-1844), daughter of the seventh head of Mito Domain Tokugawa Harutoshi. The couple had son Nijō Nariyuki, among others.

References
 

1788 births
1847 deaths
Fujiwara clan
Narinobu